Le Courrier du pays de Retz is a French weekly regional information newspaper created in 1844 and distributed on Fridays in the Pays de Retz area, in the department of Loire-Atlantique.

History 
The first issue of L'Écho de Paimbœuf, a weekly journal of literary and maritime advertisements, appeared in 1844 in Paimbœuf, then a sub-prefecture of Loire-Inférieure. Inspired by a bourgeoisie of commerce and shipowners, printed on site, this title expanded its distribution area at the same time as the town that saw it born declined. Composed for a long time of a simple two-sided leaflet, the newspaper asserted its local roots and gradually become the organ of expression of the entire Pays de Retz. Owned by a small family group, it ceased to appear in 1944 at about the same time as Paimboeuf fell within the Saint-Nazaire pocket.

Publication resumed from 1946 under the name: Le Courrier de Paimbœuf. The newspaper grew, relied on a network of local correspondents, introduced photography and, in 1970, recruited its first team of journalists and salespeople. In 1996, the title was bought by the France-Antilles group (since renamed the ). It was renamed Le Courrier du pays de Retz and left its historic birthplace to settle in Pornic, which had since become the principal town of the Pays de Retz.

Distribution 
Le Courrier du pays de Retz is published on Fridays.

Notes and references

Bibliography

See also 

 

Weekly newspapers published in France
1844 establishments in France
Publications established in 1844